Catherine Weinzaepflen (born 1 July 1946, Strasbourg) is a French writer

Biography 
Weinzaepflen spent her childhood in Alsace and the Central African Republic, studied literature in Strasbourg and lives in Paris since 1977. She made many trips to the Middle East (Turkey, Afghanistan, Iran, Pakistan) which, like Africa, permeate her books.

With Christiane Veschambre, she created and co-directs the literary magazine Land (1981-1984). In 1986, birth of his daughter Fanny whose father is the painter Michel Potage. From 1990 to 2000, she regularly stayed in Los Angeles, and from 2010 to 2014 in Sydney.

She is a member of the Reading Committee of Flammarion (1991-1993), then a member of the Commission Poésie of the Centre national du livre (2003–2006). She has created writing workshops that she continues to lead (École supérieure des Arts décoratifs de Strasbourg, 1996–2010 ) ; École spéciale d'architecture de Paris (since 2004). She regularly collaborates with the CCP (Cahier Critique de Poésie).

Bibliography 
Poetry
1976: L'Eau jaune, éditions Traboule
1977: Dans le texte, éditions La Main Bleue
1977: La Distance intime, éditions Coprah
1980: Cracher l'Afrique, Atelier de l'Agneau (Belgium)
1989: Les Maisons, Spectres familiers
2000: Les Mains dans le jaune absent, followed by York &, Le Scorff
2008: Le Temps du tableau, Editions Des femmes-Antoinette Fouque
2012: Ode à un kangourou, Editions de l'Attente
2013: Ô l'explosion des poppies, Editions de l'Attente
2015: avec Ingeborg, Editions Des femmes- Antoinette Fouque

Novels
1977: Isocelles, Des Femmes
1978: La Farnésine, jardins, Des Femmes
1983: Portrait et un rêve, Flammarion, (Prix France Culture)
1985: Am See, Flammarion; L'Atelier des Brisants; Des femmes-Antoinette Fouque, 2007 (radio drama for France Culture broadcast in 1979 under the title La Parole nomade)
1985: Totem, Flammarion, (selected for the prix Médicis)
1989: L'Ampleur du monde, Flammarion
1992: D'où êtes-vous ?, Flammarion
2002: Ismaëla, L'Atelier des Brisants
2003: Allée des Géants, L'Atelier des Brisants
2004: La Place de mon théâtre, Farrago
2006: Orpiment, Des Femmes–Antoinette Fouque
2012: Celle-là, Des femmes-Antoinette Fouque
2014: La Vie sauve, Des femmes-Antoinette Fouque

Theatre
1985: Danube jaune (commissioned by the Comédie-Française), mise-en-scène at Centre Pompidou

Texts
1975: « Entre ON et OFF », in Marguerite Duras, éditions Albatros
1980: « Fin de repas à China Cafe », in Manger, éditions Yellow Now
 various articles in the magazines Minuit, Traverses, Autrement (Paris mode d'emploi), Première Livraison, Anima, Land, Incendits (Belgium), Recueil, Jungle, Faire-Part, Murs murs, Temporali (Italy), If, Action poétique, etc.

Translations
 From English
 Le Filon by Tom Raworth, éditions CIPM/Spectres familiers, 1991
 Poèmes by Elizabeth Bishop, If n° 22
 Poèmes by Denise Levertov, Action poétique n° 173
 From German
 Poèmes by Rose Ausländer, If n° 27
 Poèmes by Christine Lavant and Ingeborg Bachmann, Action poétique n° 193 and If n° 32

Cinema
 Avenue of the Giants (script), adaptation of the novel Allée des Géants
 Chronique Cinéma & cinémas in the magazine Action poétique (2003–2005)

Literary prizes
 1983 : Prix France Culture for Portrait et un rêve
 1985 : Bourse de la Fondation Cino Del Duca
 2006 : Prix Brantôme for Orpiment

Bibliography 
 Catherine Weinzaepflen in Le Dictionnaire  universel des Créatrices, vol. 3, p. 4564

External links 
 Catherine Weinzaepflen on Éditions des femmes
 Bio-bibliographie
 Catherine Weinzaepflen on École spéciale d'architecture
 Avec Ingeborg on Terres de femmes
 Catherine Weinzaepflen on France Culture
 Catherine Weinzaepflen on Babelio
 

Writers from Strasbourg
1946 births
20th-century French non-fiction writers
21st-century French non-fiction writers
20th-century French women writers
21st-century French women writers
Prix France Culture winners
Living people